Bolshaya Mos is a rural locality (a village) in Frolovskoye Rural Settlement, Permsky District, Perm Krai, Russia. The population was 141 as of 2010. There are 62 streets.

Geography 
Bolshaya Mos is located 15 km southeast of Perm (the district's administrative centre) by road. Martyanovo is the nearest rural locality.

References 

Rural localities in Permsky District